Sinclaire  is a surname. Notable people with the name include:

Breanna Sinclairé (born c. 1991), American transgender singer
Bratt Sinclaire, Italian Eurobeat/Italo disco producer
Frederick Sinclaire (1881–1954), New Zealand Unitarian minister, pacifist, social critic, university professor and essayist
Nikki Sinclaire (born 1968), British politician
Stephanie Sinclaire (born 1954), also known as Stephanie Crawford, is a painter and director in theatre and film
William Sinclaire, American polo player

See also
Elexis Sinclaire, is a fictional character in the SiN first-person shooter video game series by Ritual Entertainmen
Sinclair